Paul J. Robertson was a Democratic member of the Indiana House of Representatives, representing the 70th District from 1978 to 2011. He was the Assistant Democratic Leader, Speaker Pro Tempore Emeritus. Upon the leaving of Dennie Oxley he assumed the position of Majority whip. He was also a teacher at Corydon Central High School for a number of years.

External links
State Representative Paul Robertson official Indiana State Legislature site
 

Democratic Party members of the Indiana House of Representatives
1946 births
Living people
People from Harrison County, Indiana